Let U Go may refer to:

"Let U Go" (Ashley Parker Angel song), released 2006
"Let U Go" (ATB song), originally titled "Wrong to Let You Go", released 2001